The 1978 CONCACAF Under-20 Championship was held in Honduras. It also served as qualification for the 1979 FIFA World Youth Championship.

Teams
The following teams entered the tournament:

Round 1

Group A

Group B

Group C

Group D

Round 2

Group A

Group B

Semifinals

Third place match

Final

Qualification to World Youth Championship
The two best performing teams qualified for the 1979 FIFA World Youth Championship.

External links
Results by RSSSF

CONCACAF Under-20 Championship
1978 in youth association football